The 1997 Elite League speedway season was the 63rd season of the top tier of speedway in the United Kingdom. It was the first season of a new league known as the Elite League and was governed by the Speedway Control Board (SCB), in conjunction with the British Speedway Promoters' Association (BSPA).

Season summary
In 1997, the single speedway league in Great Britain separated after two seasons, forming a new top division. The inaugural league consisted of ten teams. The league operated on a standard format without play-offs. The Craven Shield was introduced as an end of season cup competition for the top eight teams in the league standings.

Bradford Dukes finally won the league, their first success since 1966 when they raced as Halifax Dukes. Bradford retained top English riders Gary Havelock and Joe Screen but crucially brought in Mark Loram from Exeter Falcons. Loram had a superb season that included becoming the new British Champion.

Final table

Elite League Knockout Cup
The 1997 Elite League Knockout Cup was the 59th edition of the Knockout Cup for tier one teams but the first under its new name. Eastbourne Eagles were the winners of the competition.

First round
Group A

Group B

Semi-finals

Final
First leg

Second leg

Eastbourne Eagles were declared Knockout Cup Champions, winning on aggregate 116-66.

Final leading averages

Riders & final averages
Belle Vue

 10.07
 8.48
 7.74
 5.58
 5.56
 4.17
 1.62
 0.97

Bradford

 9.77 
 9.59 
 7.59 
 5.78
 5.70
 4.45

Coventry

 9.85
 9.02 
 6.90 
 5.84
 5.67
 5.13
 4.15
 1.44

Eastbourne

 8.44
 8.24
 7.32
 6.97 
 6.57
 4.56

Ipswich

 10.09 
 9.42
 7.74
 6.25
 6.17
 6.11
 3.62

King's Lynn

 8.07
 7.48
 7.24
 6.91
 6.26
 5.14
 3.11

Peterborough

 9.71
 7.80 
 7.71
 7.22
 4.95
 4.90
 2.52

Poole

 9.43
 7.48
 7.30
 6.43
 6.18
 4.80
 4.77
 4.45

Swindon

 9.76
 8.96
 8.12
 6.68
 4.68
 2.53

Wolverhampton

 8.62
 8.37
 7.08
 5.45
 4.76
 4.55
 4.16

See also
 List of United Kingdom Speedway League Champions
 Knockout Cup (speedway)

References

SGB Premiership
1997 in British motorsport